Houston Energy is a football team in the Women's Football Alliance. They play just south of Houston, Texas at Pearland Stadium, the football stadium on the campus of Pearland High School in nearby Pearland. The team was founded in 2000; the current president is Brian Wiggins.

Season-by-season 

|-
| colspan="6" align="center" | Houston Energy (WPFL)
|-
|2000 || 4 || 2 || 0 || 1st American West || Won American Conference Qualifier (Colorado)Won American Conference Championship (Minnesota)Won WPFL Championship (New England)
|-
|2001 || 10 || 0 || 0 || 1st American West || Won American Conference Championship (Opponent Unknown)Won WPFL Championship (Austin)
|-
|2002 || 10 || 0 || 0 || 1st American Conference || Won American Conference Championship (Arizona)Won WPFL Championship (Wisconsin)
|-
|2003 || 7 || 2 || 0 || 2nd National South|| --
|-
|2004 || 7 || 3 || 0 || 2nd American South || Won American Conference Wild Card (Long Beach)Lost American Conference Championship (Dallas)
|-
|2005 || 6 || 4 || 0 || 2nd American South || Lost Divisional Playoffs (Dallas)
|-
|2006 || 7 || 1 || 0 || 1st National East || Won National Conference Championship (Wisconsin)Lost WPFL Championship (Dallas)
|-
|2007 || 7 || 1 || 0 || 1st National Central || Won National Conference Championship (Wisconsin)Lost WPFL Championship (So Cal)
|-
|2008 || colspan="6" rowspan="1" align="center" | Did Not Play
|-
| colspan="6" align="center" | Houston Energy (IWFL)
|-
|2009 || 2 || 6 || 0 || 4th Tier I East South Atlantic || --
|-
|2010* || 5 || 3 || 0 || 4th Tier I West Midwest ||--
|-
|2011 || 0 || 0 || 0 || 1st Tier l East South Atlantic || Lost Tier I Semifinal (Ravens)
|-
|2012 || 6 || 0 || 0 || 1st Tier I South Atlantic || Won Tier I Semifinal (Xplosion)Lost Tier I Conference Championship (Blitz)
|-
|2013 || 7 || 0 || 0 || 1st Southwest || Won Western Conference Semifinal (Blaze) Won Western Conference Championship (Phantomz) Lost IWFL Championship (Phoenix)
|-
|2014 || 5 || 1 || 0 || 1st Southwest || Won Western Conference Semifinal (Phantomz) Won Western Conference Championship (Blaze) Lost IWFL Championship (Passion)
|-
|2015 || 6 || 0 || 0 || 1st Southwest || Lost Western Conference Semifinal (Blaze)
|-
|2016 || 4 || 4 || 0 || 5th Central || --
|-
|2017 || 5 || 2 || 0 || 2nd Central || Won Eastern Conference Semifinal (Queens) Lost Eastern Conference Championship (Yellow Jackets)
|-
|2018 || 4 || 1 || 0 || 2nd Central || Won IWFL Championship (Storm)
|-
| colspan="6" align="center" | Houston Energy (WFA)
|-
|2019 || 6 || 1 || 0 || 3rd WFA II American Midwest || Lost First Round (Blaze)
|-
|2020 || colspan="6" rowspan="1" align="center" | Season cancelled due to COVID-19 pandemic
|-
|2021 || 5 || 1 || 0 || 1st WFA II American Midwest || Won First Round (Trojans) Lost WFA II Conference Championship (Storm)
|-
|2022 || 4 || 2 || 0|| 2nd WFA II American || Won First Round (Valkyries) Lost WFA II Conference Championship (Blaze)
|-
!Totals || 71 || 24 || 0
|colspan="2"| (including playoffs)

* = Current Standing

Season schedules

2009

2010

External links

 Team Website

Independent Women's Football League
American football teams established in 2000
American football teams in Houston
2000 establishments in Texas
Women's sports in Texas